Donald Richard Lever (born November 14, 1952) is a Canadian former professional ice hockey left winger who played 15 seasons in the National Hockey League from 1972–73 until 1986–87. He notably helped the Calgary Flames reach the NHL playoff semifinals for the first time in club history in 1981.

Playing career
Lever was drafted 3rd overall by the Vancouver Canucks in the 1972 NHL Amateur Draft. The forward reached the 20-goal mark six times in Vancouver and played for Canada at the 1978 World Championships. Lever was traded to the Atlanta Flames alongside Brad Smith in exchange for Ivan Boldirev and Darcy Rota on February 8, 1980. He was later the first captain of the New Jersey Devils. Lever scored the first goal in Devils history. He was recognized for both his penalty killing and powerplay abilities. Lever played 1020 career NHL games, scoring 313 goals and 367 assists for 680 points. On March 9, 2009, Lever was named an assistant coach for the Montreal Canadiens by Bob Gainey after the firing of Guy Carbonneau. His contract was not renewed, and he was named head coach of the Chicago Wolves of the AHL on October 21, 2009.

Awards and achievements
1972: OHA First All-Star Team
1972: Red Tilson Trophy (OHA MVP)
1982: Played in NHL All-Star Game
1990–91: Louis A.R. Pieri Memorial Award
2006–07: Head coached the Hamilton Bulldogs to their first franchise Calder Cup, AHL championship

Career statistics

Regular season and playoffs

International

Coaching statistics

 Season  Team                Lge Type            GP  W  L  T OTL  Pct        Result 
 1987-88 Buffalo Sabres      NHL Assistant coach  
 1988-89 Buffalo Sabres      NHL Assistant coach 
 1990-91 Rochester Americans AHL Head coach      80 45 26  9   0 0.619 Lost in finals 
 1991-92 Rochester Americans AHL Head coach      80 37 31 12   0 0.537 Lost in round 3 
 1992-93 Buffalo Sabres      NHL Assistant coach 
 1993-94 Buffalo Sabres      NHL Assistant coach 
 1994-95 Buffalo Sabres      NHL Assistant coach 
 1995-96 Buffalo Sabres      NHL Associate coach 
 1996-97 Buffalo Sabres      NHL Assistant coach 
 1997-98 Buffalo Sabres      NHL Associate coach 
 1998-99 Buffalo Sabres      NHL Associate coach 
 1999-00 Buffalo Sabres      NHL Associate coach 
 2000-01 Buffalo Sabres      NHL Assistant coach 
 2001-02 Buffalo Sabres      NHL Assistant coach 
 2002-03 St. Louis Blues     NHL Assistant coach 
 2003-04 St. Louis Blues     NHL Assistant coach 
 2005-06 Hamilton Bulldogs   AHL Head coach      80 35 41 0    4 0.463  Out of playoffs 
 2006-07 Hamilton Bulldogs   AHL Head coach      80 43 28 0    9 0.594  Won championship 
 2007-08 Hamilton Bulldogs   AHL Head coach      80 36 34 0   10 0.512  Out of playoffs
 2008-09 Hamilton Bulldogs   AHL Head coach      65 39 24 0    2 0.615
 2008-09 Montreal Canadiens  NHL Assistant coach

Personal life
Lever and his wife Karen have three children, Michael, Sarah, and Caitlin.

See also
List of NHL players with 1000 games played

References

External links

1952 births
Living people
Atlanta Flames players
Buffalo Sabres coaches
Buffalo Sabres players
Calgary Flames players
Canadian ice hockey left wingers
Chicago Blackhawks scouts
Chicago Wolves coaches
Colorado Rockies (NHL) players
Ice hockey people from Ontario
Montreal Canadiens coaches
National Hockey League first-round draft picks
New Jersey Devils players
Niagara Falls Flyers players
Rochester Americans players
St. Louis Blues coaches
Sportspeople from Timmins
Vancouver Canucks captains
Vancouver Canucks draft picks
Vancouver Canucks players
Canadian ice hockey coaches